The list of museums in the Texas Gulf Coast encompasses museums defined for this context as institutions (including nonprofit organizations, government entities, and private businesses) that collect and care for objects of cultural, artistic, scientific, or historical interest and make their collections or related exhibits available for public viewing.  Museums that exist only in cyberspace (i.e., virtual museums) are not included.  Also included are non-profit art galleries and exhibit spaces.

Texas Gulf Coast
  
Counties included are Austin, Brazoria, Chambers, Colorado, Fort Bend, Galveston, Harris, Liberty, Matagorda, Montgomery, Orange, Walker, Waller, and Wharton County, Texas.

Museums

Austin - Brazoria counties

Chambers - Fort Bend counties

Galveston County

Harris County

Liberty - Montgomery counties

Wharton county

Defunct museums
 Byzantine Fresco Chapel Museum, Houston, closed in 2012
 Forbidden Gardens, Katy, closed in 2011
 Geraldine D. Humphreys Museum, Liberty, closed in 1984
 Gulf Coast Archive and Museum, Houston, archive still open by appointment but museum is closed
 Samuel May Williams House, Galveston, closed in 2007
Tate-Senftenberg-Brandon House, Columbus, closed in 2006

See also

Museum District, Houston, Texas
 List of museums in Texas
 List of museums in East Texas
 List of museums in Central Texas
 List of museums in North Texas
 List of museums in the Texas Panhandle
 List of museums in South Texas
 List of museums in West Texas

Resources
Texas Association of Museums
Historic House Museums in Texas

References

Gulf